Murchisoniidae is an extinct family of fossil gastropods in the superfamily Murchisonioidea (according to the taxonomy of the Gastropoda by Bouchet & Rocroi, 2005).

This family has no subfamilies.

Genera 
Genera within the family Murchisoniidae include:
 Murchisonia d'Archiac & Verneuil, 1841, the type genus

References 

 Koken, E. (1896). Die Gastropoden der Trias um Hallstadt. Jahrbuch der Kaiserlich-Königlichen Geologischen Reichsanstalt. 46(1): 37−126.
 Wenz, W. (1938-1944). Gastropoda. Teil 1: Allgemeiner Teil und Prosobranchia. 1-1639. In: Schindewolf, O.H. (Ed.) Handbuch der Paläozoologie, Band 6. Verlag Gebrüder Bornträger, Berlin.

External links 
 https://archive.org/stream/palozoicfossil01geol#page/234/mode/2up